Rodrigo Godínez Orozco (born 21 September 1992) is a Mexican professional footballer who plays as a defender for Liga MX club Tijuana.

Club career
Godínez was born in Zamora, Michoacán. He moved to the city of Guadalajara when he was ten years old. He enrolled in the C.D. Guadalajara academy where he stayed four years. Godínez then tried his luck at Atotonilco FC of the Tercera División, the fourth level of Mexican football. He joined the Atlas youth teams and then went on to play for Morelia's youth team.

Godínez made his first division debut on September 21, 2012, his 20th birthday, starting in a 1–1 draw against Tigres UANL. Godínez was replaced in the 52nd minute by Jefferson Montero.

Godínez has helped Morelia win the Apertura 2013 Copa MX and the 2014 Supercopa MX since debuting with the team.

In January 2019, he moved to Leones Negros.

Honours
Morelia
Copa MX: Apertura 2013
Supercopa MX: 2014

Veracruz
Copa MX: Clausura 2016

References

External links
 
 

1992 births
Living people
People from Zamora, Michoacán
Footballers from Michoacán
Mexican footballers
Association football defenders
Atlético Morelia players
Atlas F.C. footballers
C.D. Veracruz footballers
Lobos BUAP footballers
Liga MX players